Wings and Wheels was a major airshow and motorsport event held since 2005 at Dunsfold Aerodrome which is home to Formula Woman and to BBC's motoring show, Top Gear. The aerodrome is now known as Dunsfold Park and owned by The Rutland Group. It is also home to a number of aircraft including the Vickers Vimy replica, NX71MY, which was retired to Brooklands Museum in November 2009. Wings and Wheels was officially cancelled in 2019 due to the economic climate.

Charities
The show was held in support of local charities including Brooklands Museum, Cranleigh Village Hospital, CHASE and Help for Heroes and The Surrey Community Foundation.

Aircraft
The flying display always had a strong theme of Hawker and British Aerospace (BAE Systems) products, a reflection of the aviation history of both Brooklands and Dunsfold. There was also always a number of warbirds such as North American P-51 Mustangs, Douglas Dakotas and North American B-25 Mitchells reflected the interesting history of this World War 2 airfield which served postwar as a Hawker aircraft factory and flight test airfield from the 1950s until 2000.

References

External links
 Wings and Wheels

Airshows in the United Kingdom
Festivals in Surrey
2005 establishments in England
Festivals established in 2005